Parallel-a-Stitt (subtitled Sonny Stitt on the Varitone) is an album by saxophonist Sonny Stitt recorded in 1967 and released on the Roulette label. The album represents Stitt's third featuring the varitone, an electronic amplification device which altered the saxophone's sound.

Reception

Allmusic awarded the album 3 stars.

Track listing 
All compositions by Sonny Stitt except as indicated
 "Hello George" - 3:25   
 "Don't Get Around Much Anymore" (Duke Ellington) - 5:02   
 "Bye Bye Blackbird" (Ray Henderson, Mort Dixon) - 4:27   
 "Because It's Love" - 2:35   
 "Satin Doll" (Ellington, Billy Strayhorn, Johnny Mercer) - 4:40   
 "The Shadow of Your Smile" (Johnny Mandel, Paul Francis Webster) - 5:18   
 "Chinatown My Chinatown" (William Jerome, Jean Schwartz) - 3:45   
 "Jeep's Blues" (Ellington, Johnny Hodges) - 2:09   
 "Laura" (David Raksin, Mercer) - 2:45

Personnel 
Sonny Stitt - alto saxophone, tenor saxophone, varitone
Jerome Richardson - alto flute
George Berg - baritone saxophone
Don Patterson - organ
George Duvivier - bass 
Walter Jones - drums

References 

1967 albums
Roulette Records albums
Sonny Stitt albums